Mark Robert Rowland (born 7 March 1963 in Watersfield, West Sussex, England) is a retired male distance-runner from the United Kingdom, who specialised in the 3000m steeplechase.

Athletics career
Rowland came third in the men's men's 3000 m Steeplechase at the 1988 Olympics behind the Kenyan competitors Julius Kariuki (gold) and Peter Koech (silver). His time was 8:07.96 minutes which remains a British record. Rowland became the eighth and, thus far, final British athlete to pick up a medal in the steeplechase event at the Olympics. His post-race interview at the track-side was famous for his quote: 

Two years later, Rowland was beaten to the gold in a sprint finish in the same event at the European Championships in Split by the Italian athlete Francesco Panetta. He also represented England in the 5,000 metres event, at the 1990 Commonwealth Games in Auckland, New Zealand.

Coaching career
After retiring, he became a coach to many promising young British steeplechasers and was steeplechase and middle-distance coach for UK Athletics. He is now training athletes, including British middle-distance runner Jemma Simpson and American Lauren Fleshman in the US for the Oregon Track Club Elite.

He also coached Mike East, British 1500m runner to his 6th place at the 2004 Athens Olympics.

International competitions

References

External links

gbrathletics

1963 births
Living people
People from Coldwaltham
British male steeplechase runners
English male steeplechase runners
English male middle-distance runners
Olympic athletes of Great Britain
Olympic bronze medallists for Great Britain
Athletes (track and field) at the 1988 Summer Olympics
European Athletics Championships medalists
Medalists at the 1988 Summer Olympics
Olympic bronze medalists in athletics (track and field)
Athletes (track and field) at the 1990 Commonwealth Games
Commonwealth Games competitors for England
People educated at Midhurst Grammar School